Clem is a rural unincorporated community in Braxton County, West Virginia, United States.

A post office was established at this location in 1913.  Clemuel Baxter Hart (1881-1960), the first postmaster, gave the community its name.Certificate of Death, Clemuel B. Hart

References

Unincorporated communities in Braxton County, West Virginia
Unincorporated communities in West Virginia